Puerto Lleras is a town and municipality in the Meta Department, Colombia.

The town is on the Ariari River, and is served by Puerto Lleras Airport.

References

Municipalities of Meta Department